Discolabeo wuluoheensis is a species of cyprinid fish endemic to China.

References

 

Cyprinid fish of Asia
Freshwater fish of China
Fish described in 1996
Labeoninae